The Butler Bulldogs men's soccer team is an intercollegiate varsity sports team of Butler University, an NCAA Division I member school located in Indianapolis, IN. The team played its final season in the Horizon League in 2011; on July 1, 2012, the Bulldogs joined the Atlantic 10 Conference for one season. The team currently plays in the Big East Conference.

History
Butler University first fielded a varsity men's soccer team in 1989, when they earned a 12–7 record under head coach Langdon Kumler, including a 7–0 record against teams from the state of Indiana. The Bulldogs began conference play the following season when their record improved to 14–6 with a 5–3 mark in the Midwestern Collegiate Conference (now called the Horizon League). Coach Kumler left the program following the 1992 season and the Bulldogs were next coached by Ian Martin, who led the team to its first NCAA tournament in 1995, when the Bulldogs made it to the round of 16 after beating in-state rival and perennial national finalist, the Indiana Hoosiers. Martin also coached the team to its second appearance in the round of 16 in 1998 before leaving the program following the 1999 season. Todd Bramble served as the head coach for one season and is now the head coach for the women's soccer team at the University of Alabama. The Bulldogs next appeared in the NCAA tournament in 2001 under head coach Joe Sochacki, who left after the 2005 season.  Kelly Findley served as the Bulldogs' head coach from 2006 until 2010 and was arguably the team's best coach, leading them to consecutive appearances in the NCAA tournament in 2009 and 2010, including an unbeaten regular season record.  Findley left following the 2010 season to take the helm at North Carolina State.

Butler left the Horizon League following the 2011 season when the athletic department moved to the Atlantic 10 Conference.  During their time in the Horizon, the Bulldogs earned five conference tournament championships, in 1995, 1997, 1998, 2001, and 2010; and five conference season championships, in 1996, 1998, 2004, 2009, and 2010.

Butler wins the 2016 BIG EAST Championship!

Yearly records

Team honors

Horizon League Regular Season Champions (7): 1994, 1996, 1998, 2004, 2008, 2009, 2010

Horizon League Tournament Champions (5): 1995, 1997, 1998, 2001, 2010

Big East Conference Regular Season Champions (2): 2016, 2017

Big East Conference Tournament Champions (1): 2016

NCAA Tournament Appearances (9): 1995, 1997, 1998, 2001, 2009, 2010, 2016, 2017, 2019

NCAA Tournament Round of 16 Appearances (3): 1995, 1998, 2017

Players, awards, and recognition

References

External links
 

 
1989 establishments in Indiana